Bandella is a genus of flies in the family Empididae.

Species
B. albitarsis Bickel, 2002
B. allynensis Bickel, 2002
B. cerra Bickel, 2002
B. costalis Bickel, 2002
B. duvalli Bickel, 2002
B. maxi Bickel, 2002
B. montana Bickel, 2002
B. noorinbee Bickel, 2002
B. tasmanica Bickel, 2002

References

Empidoidea genera
Empididae